Nana Upstairs & Nana Downstairs is a 1973 non-fiction children's book by Tomie dePaola which introduces children to the concept of death.

Content
This autobiographical story introduces children to the concept of death through the eyes of 4-year-old Tommy, who has a special relationship with his grandmother and great-grandmother, and visits them regularly. Nana Upstairs dies when he's a child, and Nana Downstairs dies when he's an adult; at both ages, Tommy learns to keep his beloved Nanas in his memory.

The original edition of this autobiographical story was published in 1973; a second edition, published in 1998, has new illustrations and layout.

Legacy
This book has been cited in over 30 other works, including books on how to write, books on childhood grief, and books on other topics.

References

External links
Nana Upstairs & Nana Downstairs by Tomie dePaola (Used, New, Out-of-Print) - Alibris

1973 children's books
Children's non-fiction books
American picture books
Books about death
Works by Tomie de Paola